The Mangaturuturu River is a river of the centre of New Zealand's North Island. It has also been known as Sulphur River, or Sulphur Creek. There were also lahars in 1969 and September 1995. Earlier lahars were around 8,500 and 10,500 years ago.

See also
List of rivers of New Zealand

References

Rivers of Manawatū-Whanganui
Rivers of New Zealand